Dąbrowice  is a village in Kutno County, Łódź Voivodeship, in central Poland. It is the seat of the gmina (administrative district) called Gmina Dąbrowice.

The village has a population of 1,300.

Notable people
  (1903–1942), Polish priest murdered in the Auschwitz concentration camp, Blessed of the Catholic Church

References

Villages in Kutno County